Events in the year 1938 in Norway.

Incumbents
 Monarch – Haakon VII
 Prime Minister – Johan Nygaardsvold (Labour Party)

Events

 14 January – Norway claims Queen Maud Land in Antarctica.
 20 November – Queen Maud of Norway dies
 Construction starts on Kristiansand Airport, Kjevik

Popular culture

Sports

Music

Film

Literature

Notable births

January

2 January – Hans Herbjørnsrud, short story writer.
9 January – Agnar Sandmo, economist and professor (died 2019).
10 January – Thor Bjarne Bore, newspaper editor and politician (died 2019).
13 January – Kåre Rønnes, soccer player and coach
16 January – Helga Hernes, political scientist, diplomat and politician.
18 January – Rolf Ketil Bjørn, businessperson and politician (died 2008).
19 January – Anne Karin Elstad, author (died 2012).
23 January – Kari Buen, sculptor.

February
 
 

1 February – Kjell Henriksen, scientist (died 1996)
10 February – 
Raphael Høegh-Krohn, mathematician (died 1988).  
Per Norvik, journalist and editor. 
12 February – Tor Obrestad, novelist, poet and documentary writer (died 2020).
14 February – Anita Thallaug, actress and singer.
20 February – Inge Lønning, theologian, educator and politician (died 2013).
24 February – Kristian Rambjør, businessman (died 2015).
27 February – 
Marie Brenden, educator and politician (died 2012).
Sverre Olaf Lie, pediatrician.

March 
 

4 March – Magnar Lundemo, cross-country skier and track and field athlete (died 1987).
19 March  
Egil Lillestøl, physicist. 
Marit Løvvig, politician.
23 March – Berit Kullander, actress, dancer, and singer.
25 March – Kaare Aksnes, astrophysicist.
29 March – 
Arne Lanes, weightlifter.
Knut Mørkved, diplomat (died 2017).

April 
 

4 April – Marit Økern, orienteering competitor.
5 April – Åge Storhaug, gymnast (died 2012).
6 April – 
Arne Solli, general (died 2017).
Janken Varden, stage director.
7 April – Oddbjørn Engvold, astronomer.
9 April – Ivar Medaas, musician (died 2005).
11 April – Hans Jacob Hansteen, architect.
12 April – Rolf Bendiksen, politician.
20 April – Tor Richter, sports shooter (died 2010).
23 April – Kåre Kivijärvi, photographer (died 1991).
27 April – Rolf Olsen, sprint canoer.

May
 

4 May – Birgit Brock-Utne, educator.
8 May – Lucie Paus Falck, politician.
20 May – Lars Walløe, scientist.
22 May – Ulf Sand, civil servant and politician (died 2014). 
23 May – Ole Herman Fisknes, jurist and civil servant
26 May – Inger Lise Gjørv, politician (died 2009).
29 May 
Karsten Alnæs, historian, writer and journalist.
Jan Gulbrandsen, hurdler, politician and sports official (died 2007).
Ove Liavaag, civil servant (died 2007).

June 
 

3 June 
Turid Dørumsgaard Varsi, politician.
Thor Listau, politician (died 2014).
15 June – Roger Gudmundseth, politician.
16 June – Reidar Nielsen, newspaper editor and politician (died 2018).
18 June – Marit Tingelstad, politician.
23 June – 
Unn Aarrestad, politician.
Martin Stavrum, politician.

July 
 

7 July – Trygve Henrik Hoff, singer, composer, songwriter, and writer (died 1987). 
10 July – Jostein Nerbøvik, historian (died 2004)
13 July – Yngve Hågensen, trade union leader
18 July – Bjørn Myhre, archaeologist (died 2015).
21 July – Willy Martinussen, sociologist.
30 July – Kate Næss, poet (died 1987).

August 
6 August – Tone Vigeland, goldsmith.
10 August – Erling Steineide, cross-country skier (died 2019).
18 August – Arvid Torgeir Lie, writer (died 2020).
25 August – Ruth Lilian Brekke, politician

September 
8 September – Olav Dalsøren, ice hockey player.
10 September – Eva Birkeland, civil servant.  
11 September – Sondre Bratland, folk singer.  
13 September – Guttorm Guttormsgaard, visual artist (died 2019).
18 September – Lars Gunnar Lie, politician

October 
 

2 October – Kjell Bartholdsen, jazz musician (died 2009).
11 October – Arvid Jacobsen, newspaper editor (died 2014)
12 October – Kari Rolfsen, sculptor and illustrator (died 2020).
12 October – Bjørn Hansen, news presenter and correspondent
14 October – Terje Bergstad, painter and printmaker (died 2014).
27 October – Jan Martin Larsen, cartographer, orienteer and politician
31 October – 
Egil Ly, sailor.
Magnar Mangersnes, organist and choral conductor.

November 
 

2 November – Oddvar Torsheim, visual artist, poet and musician.
9 November – 
Tove Stang Dahl, legal scholar (died 1993).  
Dag Østerberg, sociologist, philosopher and musicologist (died 2017). 
11 November – Fredrik Heffermehl, jurist, writer and translator
15 November – Aril Edvardsen, evangelical preacher and missionary (died 2008)
23 November – Arvid Vatle, physician
27 November – Ragnar Tveiten, biathlete and double World Champion
29 November – Kjartan Rødland, journalist, newspaper editor and author.

December 
 

2 December – Reidar Grønhaug, social anthropologist (died 2005)
9 December – Astrid Marie Nistad, politician
11 December – Asbjørn Bjørnset, politician
15 December – Fred Anton Maier, speed skater (died 2015). 
16 December – Liv Ullmann, actress.
25 December – Finn Graff, illustrator. 
27 December – Oddvar Nes, linguist (died 2016)

Full date unknown
Geir Grung, diplomat (died 2005)

Notable deaths
3 January – Ludvig Meyer, barrister, newspaper editor and politician (born 1861)
7 January – Oluf Christian Müller, politician (born 1876)
8 January – Nils Riddervold Jensen, politician and Minister (born 1863)
9 February – Axel Paulsen, speed skater and figure skater (born 1855)
21 March – Jacob Opdahl, gymnast and Olympic gold medallist (born 1894)
25 March – Edvard Hagerup Bull, judge and politician (born 1855)
16 June – Torolf Prytz, architect, goldsmith and politician (born 1858)
28 July – Johan Fahlstrøm, actor and theatre manager (born 1867)
15 September – Adolph Gundersen, Norwegian American medical doctor (born 1865)
18 September – Erik Rotheim, chemical engineer and inventor of the aerosol spray can (born 1898)
25 September – Paul Olaf Bodding, missionary, linguist and folklorist (born 1865)
16 October – Nils Yngvar Ustvedt, medical doctor and politician (born 1868)
23 November – Erik Werenskiold, painter and illustrator (born 1855)
11 December – Christian Lous Lange, historian, political scientist and Nobel Peace Prize laureate (born 1869)
12 December – Holger Sinding-Larsen, architect (born 1869)

Full date unknown
Gunnar Olavsson Helland, Hardanger fiddle maker (born 1852)
Jakob Sverdrup, philologist and lexicographer (born 1881)

See also

References

External links